Eccopsis incultana is a moth of the family Tortricidae. It is found in western, central, eastern and southern Africa, including most African islands of the Atlantic and Indian Ocean.

References 

 Walker 1863c. List of the Specimens of Lepidopterous Insects in the Collection of the British Museum. Part XXVIII.– Tortricites & Tineites. - — 28:i–iv, 287–561

External links 
 westafricanlepidoptera.com: Pictures of Eccopsis incultana

Olethreutini
Moths described in 1863
Moths of Africa
Moths of Madagascar
Moths of Mauritius
Moths of Réunion
Moths of São Tomé and Príncipe
Moths of Seychelles